Teen Spirit: The Tribute to Kurt Cobain is a documentary about Nirvana band leader Kurt Cobain. Released in July 1994 it is significant as the first unofficial Kurt Cobain or Nirvana documentary to be available as a home video.

Notable appearances

The film features interviews with Charles Peterson who was Nirvana's photographer. The film also features interviews with writer and pop music critic Ann Powers of The Village Voice, as well as with Grant Alden of The Rocket and Nils Bernstein of Sub Pop, Nirvana's original record label. The film documents Nirvana's rise to stardom, interviews with band members, other musicians, music journalists and fans. It also showcases Cobain's hometown of Aberdeen, Washington to investigate what influenced his musical perspective.

Critical reception

AllMusic gave a poor review of the film, stating that: "Similar in style to the 1998 exploitation documentary Kurt & Courtney, the 1996 home video Teen Spirit: Tribute to Kurt Cobain does a shoddy job of trying to tell the story of Kurt Cobain". However, MVD stated that: "It is a moving tribute to Kurt the man, and his music, from those who were inspired by his extraordinary genius. Allmusic also noted that due to copyrights the film does not include any of Nirvana's music. Radio & Records described the film as the "video scrapbook companion to Nirvana's From the Muddy Banks of the Wishkah LP".

Re-release

The film was re-released on DVD in 2001 as an extended director's cut of 75 minutes long with a different cover art.

Charts

Weekly charts

Year-end charts

References

1994 films
1996 films
Rockumentaries
Films about Kurt Cobain
1990s English-language films
1990s American films